The  is a 53.0 km Japanese railway line in Ibaraki Prefecture, which connects Mito Station in Mito with Kashima Soccer Stadium Station in Kashima. It is owned and run by the third-sector railway operating company Kashima Rinkai Railway (KRT).

Stations

Rolling stock
, passenger services on the line were operated by a fleet of 15 6000 series diesel railcars and three 8000 series diesel railcars. The railway also operates three diesel locomotives: Class KRD locomotive number KRD 5 and two Class KRD64 locomotives, KRD64-1 and KRD64-2.

The first 8000 series diesel car, 8001, entered revenue service on 26 March 2016.

6000 series fleet details
The individual car histories of the 6000 series fleet are as follows.

8000 series fleet details
The individual car histories of the 8000 series fleet are as follows.

Former rolling stock
The following types also previously operated on the line.
 2000 series DMU cars 2001 to 2004 (former JNR KiHa 20 series cars, operated from December 1985 until December 1991)
 7000 series two-car diesel multiple unit (DMU) train owned by Ibaraki Prefecture and reserved for special event services. (Operated from 1992 until October 2015)

2000 series fleet details
The individual car histories of the 2000 series fleet were as follows.

7000 series fleet details
The individual car histories of the two-car 7000 series set were as follows.

History
The line opened on 14 March 1985 between Mito and Kita-Kashima (now Kashima Soccer Stadium) stations.

Freight operations over the line commenced from 1 November 1989, but were discontinued from 16 March 1996.

Wanman driver-only operation began on the line from 1 April 2001.

References

Rail transport in Ibaraki Prefecture
Kashima Rinkai Railway
1067 mm gauge railways in Japan
Railway lines opened in 1985
Japanese third-sector railway lines